Heiko Winter (born 27 February 1943) is a German boxer. He competed in the men's light welterweight event at the 1964 Summer Olympics.

References

1943 births
Living people
German male boxers
Olympic boxers of the United Team of Germany
Boxers at the 1964 Summer Olympics
Sportspeople from Magdeburg
Light-welterweight boxers